The First Four Years is a compilation album by the American hardcore punk band Black Flag. It was released in 1983 on SST Records. The compilation consists of all of the group's material released before Henry Rollins became the band's vocalist in 1981. It essentially collects the extended plays Nervous Breakdown (1979), Jealous Again (1980), Six Pack (1981), and the single "Louie Louie", with two tracks from various artists' compilation albums.

Tracks 1–4 are taken from Nervous Breakdown, tracks 5–9 are taken from Jealous Again, tracks 11–13 are from Six Pack, and tracks 15–16 are taken from the "Louie Louie" single. Tracks 10 and 14 were originally released on the New Alliance Records compilation albums Cracks in the Sidewalk (1980) and Chunks (1981).

Track listing

Personnel
 Keith Morris – lead vocals on tracks 1–4
 Ron Reyes – lead vocals on tracks 5–8
 Dez Cadena – lead vocals on tracks 10–16
 Greg Ginn – guitar
 Chuck Dukowski – bass, lead vocals on track 9
 Brian Migdol – drums on tracks 1–4
 Robo – drums on all other tracks

Production
 Spot; Geza X, Black Flag – producers
 Raymond Pettibon – artwork

References 

Black Flag (band) compilation albums
Albums produced by Spot (producer)
Albums produced by Geza X
1983 compilation albums
SST Records compilation albums